The Georgian March (GM) is a national-conservative political party and social movement in Georgia. It is led by Sandro Bregadze. The party is primarily known for street protests as well as its opposition to LGBT rights and immigration.

Georgian March was formed as a social movement in July 2017 for the purpose of furthering anti-immigration legislation. It became a political party in July 2020 and run in the 2020 Georgian parliamentary election.

Electoral performance

References

2016 establishments in Georgia (country)
Anti-immigration politics in Europe
Anti-Islam political parties in Europe
Conservative parties in Georgia (country)
Nationalist parties in Georgia (country)
Eastern Orthodox political parties
Eastern Orthodoxy and far-right politics
Far-right political parties
Georgian nationalism
Organizations that oppose LGBT rights
Political parties established in 2016
Political parties in Georgia (country)
Social conservative parties
National conservative parties
Anti-Islam sentiment in Georgia